Natasha Joubert (born 24 July 1997) is a South African entrepreneur, model and beauty pageant titleholder who was crowned as the second runner-up in Miss South Africa 2020. She was later designated as Miss Universe South Africa 2020 and represented South Africa at the Miss Universe 2020 pageant.

Early life and education
Joubert was born on 23 July 1997 in Pretoria. Her father died when Joubert was a teenager, while her mother, Ninette, was a final year Bachelor of Laws student at the time of Joubert competing in Miss South Africa 2020. She is the youngest of three siblings.

Joubert was raised in Centurion, Gauteng, and attended Hoërskool Eldoraigne. Afterwards she enrolled in Boston City Campus and Business College, and received a Bachelor of Commerce degree in marketing management in 2020. Prior to Miss South Africa 2020, Joubert worked as a public relations officer for a law firm, and also was the founder and owner of the fashion design company Natalia Jefferys.

Pageantry
Joubert began her pageantry career in 2016, when she competed in Miss Globe South Africa 2016. In 2020, Joubert applied to compete in Miss South Africa 2020. On 11 June 2020, it was announced that Joubert had advanced as one of the thirty-five women selected to participate in further auditions. She later was announced as one of the top fifteen semifinalists on 24 June, and as one of the ten finalists on 5 August.

Joubert competed in the finals of Miss South Africa 2020 on 24 October at The Table Bay Hotel in Cape Town. She ultimately advanced to the top five, and later to the top three. After reaching the top three, she placed as the second runner-up, behind eventual winner Shudufhadzo Musida and first runner-up Thato Mosehle. On 10 December, it was announced that Joubert had been designated by the Miss South Africa Organisation to serve as Miss Universe South Africa 2020, and she represented South Africa at Miss Universe 2020, but did not place among the semifinalists despite giving an amazing performance throughout the competition. Her unplacement ended South Africa’s three year-streak of consecutive placements in Top 3, from 2017 to 2019.

References

External links

1997 births
Afrikaner people
Living people
South African beauty pageant winners
South African female models
Miss Universe 2020 contestants
People from Centurion, Gauteng
People from Pretoria